Tree mouse may refer to members of the following genera of rodents:
Arborimus, from western Foja mountain ;
Chiropodomys, from southern and southeastern Asia;
Chiruromys, from New Guinea and adjacent islands;
Haeromys, from Borneo, the Philippines, and Sulawesi;
Irenomys, the Chilean tree mouse, from southwestern South America;
Lorentzimys, the long-footed tree mouse, from New Guinea;
Platacanthomys, the Malabar spiny tree mouse, from southern India;
Pogonomys, from New Guinea and northern Australia;
Prionomys, Dollman's tree mouse, from central Africa;
Typhlomys, the soft-furred tree mouse, from southern China and Vietnam;
Vandeleuria, from southern and southeastern Asia.

Animal common name disambiguation pages